Chaenotheca is a genus of lichenized fungi within the family Coniocybaceae. The sexual reproduction structures are a mass of loose ascospores that are enclosed by a cup shaped exciple sitting on top of a tiny stalk, having the appearance of a dressmaker's pin (called a mazaedium), hence the common name pin lichen. Genus members are also commonly called needle lichens.

Species
Chaenotheca balsamconensis  – North America
Chaenotheca biesboschii  – Netherlands
Chaenotheca brachypoda 
Chaenotheca brunneola 
Chaenotheca chlorella 
Chaenotheca chrysocephala 
Chaenotheca citriocephala 
Chaenotheca confusa  – South America
Chaenotheca degelii 
Chaenotheca deludens 
Chaenotheca erkahomattiorum  – North America
Chaenotheca ferruginea 
Chaenotheca furfuracea 
Chaenotheca gracilenta 
Chaenotheca gracillima 
Chaenotheca hispidula 
Chaenotheca hygrophila 
Chaenotheca laevigata 
Chaenotheca longispora 
Chaenotheca nitidula  – North America
Chaenotheca papuensis 
Chaenotheca phaeocephala 
Chaenotheca selvae 
Chaenotheca stemonea 
Chaenotheca trichialis 
Chaenotheca xyloxena

References

Ascomycota genera
Lichen genera
Taxa named by Theodor Magnus Fries
Taxa described in 1860